Khoni is a town in the Western Georgian region (mkhare) of Imereti with the population of 8987 (2014 Georgia census). It is situated on the left bank of the Tskhenistkali River in the north-west of Imereti, close to the border with the region of Samegrelo-Zemo Svaneti and 266 km west of Georgia's capital Tbilisi. The town serves as an administrative centre of the Khoni District. Its economy is based on agriculture, particularly tea production.

Khoni has been known as a lively trading locale and a see of the Georgian Orthodox diocese since the Middle Ages. The town itself was founded in the 6th or 9th century and the still functioning St. George's Cathedral in downtown Khoni was constructed between the 11th and 13th centuries. It acquired the status of a town in 1921. Under the Soviet Union, it was named after the Marxist revolutionary Alexander Tsulukidze in 1936, but the historical name of Khoni was restored in 1991.

Notable people from Khoni 
Akaki Chkhenkeli [1874-1959], Georgian politician and publisher
Kita Chkhenkeli (1895-1963), Georgian linguist
Tamar Abakelia (1905-1953), Georgian sculptor
Irakli Abashidze (1909-1992), Georgian poet and public figure
Apollon Kutateladze (1900-1972), Georgian painter
Nana Mchedlidze (1926-2016), Georgian actress, film director and screenwriter
Ipolite Khvichia (1910-1985), Georgian actor

See also
 Imereti

References

Cities and towns in Imereti
Kutaisi Governorate
Populated places in Khoni Municipality